Don Bosco Technical College–Cebu is a private Catholic vocational basic and higher education institution in Cebu City managed by the Philippines South Province (FIS) of the Salesians of the Society of Saint John Bosco. The basic education department accepts male students only except the Senior High School which is coeducational. The TVED and college department are also coeducational. It was established as a center for out-of-school youth by Italian Salesian missionaries in 1954 and later developed into a technical school. It was originally named as Don Bosco Technical High School but commonly called 'Boys' Town' in the city. It was later renamed Don Bosco Technology Center and in 2017 as Don Bosco Technical College. A namesake and sister school exists in Mandaluyong.

Educational programs
DBTC provides four programs for its students: Academic Curriculum, Technical Curriculum, Pastoral Programs and Athletic Programs. Students receive technical training in mechanical, electrical, civil, and computer technologies. Pastoral programs include integration of Catholic instruction, celebration of the sacraments and the Salesian Youth Movement in the school. The school is passionate for sports with specialized training in basketball, football, and volleyball.

Response to COVID-19 pandemic of 2020
The school shifted to distance, modular, and online learning at the advent of the COVID-19 pandemic. It activated its distance learning program called BUILD - "Bosconians Under Independent Learning and Development". It uses the platforms of G Suite for Education and Microsoft 365 for online learning. Classes are held through video conferences in Google Meet and Microsoft Teams while modules for distance learning are hosted in Moodle.

Administration
The school is animated by the Salesian Community composed of the following priests and brothers and their corresponding offices:

PAASCU accreditation
The school is a level 1 accredited school by the PAASCU awarded in 2018.

See also
Salesians of Don Bosco
Don Bosco Technical College (Mandaluyong)

References

External links
 

Don Bosco schools in the Philippines
Engineering universities and colleges in the Philippines
Schools in Cebu City
Catholic universities and colleges in the Philippines
Private universities and colleges in the Philippines
Universities and colleges in Cebu City
1954 establishments in the Philippines
Educational institutions established in 1954